Wait for Me  is an international telecast, talk show and also a popular public search service. It appeared on Russian television since March 14, 1998. It was originally broadcast on Russia-1 (1998), before being broadcast on ORT (since 2002   on Channel One Russia) (1999–2017) and currently being broadcast on NTV. Wait for Me is also a TEFI TV Award winner (2018) 

The production of the program is handled by the television company VIDgital. The authors of  idea were journalists Oksana Naychuk and Victoria El-Mualla.

In the first years of the program's existence, it was possible to find 15-20 people each month with its help, and in 10 years about 150 thousand people were found. By October 2017, their number had increased to 200 thousand.

Since 2005, VID has begun production of  Wait for Me  for viewing in other countries. Since then, the program has come out in an international format.

Also, from October 2000 to 2004 a newspaper was published with the same name.

List of leading
 Oksana Naychuk (1998) 
 Igor Kvasha (1998—2012)
 Maria Shukshina (1999–2014) 
 Sergei Nikonenko (2000, 2008) 
 Chulpan Khamatova (2005–2006) 
 Aleksandr Domogarov (2005) 
 Mikhail Yefremov (2009–2014) 
 Egor Beroev (2014)
  Aleksandr Galibin (2014–2017) 
 Ksenia Alfyorova (2014–2017) 
 Sergei Shakurov (2017–2018) 
 Julia Vysotskaya (2017–2018) 
 Grigory Sergeev (2017–2018) 
 Aleksandr Lazarev Jr. (since 2018)
 Tatyana Arntgolts (since 2018)

References

External links
  Official Website

Russian television shows
1998 Russian television series debuts
Channel One Russia original programming
Russia-1 original programming
NTV (Russia) original programming
1990s Russian television series
2000s Russian television series
2010s Russian television series